The Zhengzhou Ring Expressway, designated as G3001, is  in Zhengzhou, Henan, People's Republic of China.

History
The north section, which is in concurrency with G30 Lianyungang–Khorgas Expressway, was finished in 1995 as a section of the Kaifeng-Luoyang Expressway, which is one of the earliest expressways in Henan. The east section is in concurrency with G4 Beijing–Hong Kong and Macau Expressway, and was finished in 2004.

The south and west section, also known as Zhengzhou Southwest Ring Expressway, was finished in August 2005.

Route
The expressway forms a circle around the city of Zhengzhou. It consists of 3 parts: the Zhengzhou Southwest Ring Expressway at south and west, the G4 Beijing–Hong Kong and Macau Expressway at east and the G30 Lianyungang–Khorgas Expressway to the north.

Road Conditions

Speed Limit
The maximum speed limit is 120 km/h for light passenger vehicles and 90 km/h for heavy vehicles. The minimum speed limit is 60 km/h.

Tolls
The expressway is currently toll-free for light passenger vehicles registered in Zhengzhou (the initial characters on licence plates are 豫A). 

Other vehicles using the expressway will be tolled.

Lanes
 8 lanes (4 lanes for each direction) on north section and east section (G30 - Hanghai E. Road).
 6 lanes (3 lanes for each direction) on other sections.

Traffic
Some exits in the north and east, such as Huiji, Wenhua Road, Liulin, Zhengzhou New Area, Putian, etc. are often congested during rush hours.

Service Areas
 Zhengzhou North Service Area
 Zhengzhou East Service Area
 Zhengzhou West Service Area

Connections
  at Guangwu Interchange
  at Liujiang Interchange
  at Xiangyunsi Interchange
  at Zhengzhou South Interchange
  at Houzhai Interchange
  at Zhengzhou Southwest Interchange

List of Exits
In counter-clockwise order from northwest direction:

References

Chinese national-level expressways
Expressways in Henan
Transport in Henan
Expressways in Zhengzhou